Maguan is a town in Zhong County, Chongqing, China. , it administers four residential neighborhoods and 16 villages: 
Neighborhoods
Maguan Community
Gaodong Community
Huangqin Community
Daoguan Community

Villages
Dafan Village
Luoyang Village
Shuangji Village
Helin Village
Shuangshi Village
Guoyuan Village
Jinbao Village
Gaodu Village
Qixin Village
Hexin Village
Jingui Village
Guiyang Village
Daqiao Village
Gaoqiao Village
Longxiao Village
Baigao Village

See also 
 List of township-level divisions of Chongqing

References 

Township-level divisions of Chongqing
Zhong County